Convoy Buddies (also known as Kid Stuff) is a 1975 Italian-Spanish adventure-comedy film directed by Giuliano Carnimeo and starring Michael Coby and Paul L. Smith. 

The was selected for American release by Film Ventures International, and producer Edward L. Montoro changed Smith's name to Bob Spencer and Cantafora's name to Terrance Hall. Smith sued, successfully arguing that an actor's name recognition is vital to his career. The judicial system agreed and ruled against FVI, which paid Smith damages and court costs.

Plot
Toby and Butch are a couple of incompetent crooks who get a truck hauling job bringing insecticide from Italy to France. Unbeknownst to the bumbling duo, they are really smuggling guns. A group of equally inept mobsters try to steal the guns to no avail.

Cast 

Michael Coby as  Butch (Matteo)
Paul L. Smith as  Toby (Simone)
Dominic Barto as Lucky
Giuliana Calandra as Rosy
Eduardo Fajardo as  Le Renard 
Ángel del Pozo as  Navy Official
Mario Brega as  Le Renard's Henchman
Riccardo Petrazzi as  Paul 
Emilio Messina as  Jean
Nello Pazzafini as French Sailor
Tony Norton as Frou-Frou
Francisco Merino as Organizer

See also 
 List of Italian films of 1975

References

External links

Italian adventure comedy films
Spanish adventure comedy films
1970s buddy comedy films
1970s adventure comedy films
Films directed by Giuliano Carnimeo
Films scored by Guido & Maurizio De Angelis
Italian buddy comedy films
1975 comedy films
1975 films
1970s Italian-language films
1970s Italian films
1970s Spanish films